This is a list of mayors of Berkeley, California. The list includes people serving in the equivalent position of president, in the city's early history.

Presidents, Town Board of Trustees (1878–1909)
Abel Whitton (Workingman's Party) 1878–1881
A. McKinstry 1881–1883
W.C. Wright (Republican) 1883–1885
J.B. Henley 1885–1887
Henry L. Whitney 1887–1889
Samuel Heywood / Joseph L. Scotchler (Republican) 1889–1891
Reuben Rickard (Republican) 1891–1893
Byron E. Underwood / Martin J. Acton / Charles S. Preble 1893–1895
Reuben Rickard (Republican) 1895
John W. Richards 1895–1899
William H. Marston 1899–1903
Thomas Rickard (Republican) 1903–1909
Mayors
Beverly L. Hodghead (Democrat) 1909–1911
J. Stitt Wilson (Socialist) 1911–1913
Charles D. Heywood (Republican) 1913–1915
Samuel C. Irving (Democrat) 1915–1919
Louis Bartlett (Republican) 1919–1923
Frank D. Stringham (Republican) 1923–1927
Michael B. Driver (Republican) 1927–1930
Thomas E. Caldecott (Republican) 1930–1932
Edward N. Ament (Republican) 1932–1939
Frank S. Gaines (Republican) 1939–1943
Fitch Robertson (Republican) 1943–1946
Carrie L. Hoyt (Republican) 1947 (January–April)
Laurance L. Cross (Democrat) 1947–1955
Claude B. Hutchison (Republican) 1955–1963
Wallace Johnson (Republican) 1963–1971
Warren Widener (Democrat) 1971–1979, first African-American mayor
Gus Newport, (Berkeley Citizens Action) 1979–1986
Loni Hancock, (Berkeley Citizens Action) 1986–1994
Jeffrey Shattuck Leiter, 1994 (March–December)
Shirley Dean, (Berkeley Democrat Club) 1994–2002
Tom Bates, 2002–2016
Jesse Arreguín, 2016–

External links
City of Berkeley Mayor's Office

Berkeley, California-related lists
 
Berkeley